The 1991 Peak Antifreeze 500 was the 23rd stock car race of the 1991 NASCAR Winston Cup Series season and the 21st iteration of the event. The race was held on Sunday, September 15, 1991, before an audience of 77,000 in Dover, Delaware at Dover Downs International Speedway, a 1-mile (1.6 km) permanent oval-shaped racetrack. The race took the scheduled 500 laps to complete. At race's end, Leo Jackson Motorsports driver Harry Gant would manage to dominate a majority of the race, lapping the field to take his 15th career NASCAR Winston Cup Series victory, his fourth victory of the season, and his third straight victory. To fill out the top three, Junior Johnson & Associates driver Geoff Bodine and Bud Moore Engineering driver Morgan Shepherd would finish second and third, respectively.

Background 

Dover Downs International Speedway is an oval race track in Dover, Delaware, United States that has held at least two NASCAR races since it opened in 1969. In addition to NASCAR, the track also hosted USAC and the NTT IndyCar Series. The track features one layout, a 1-mile (1.6 km) concrete oval, with 24° banking in the turns and 9° banking on the straights. The speedway is owned and operated by Dover Motorsports.

The track, nicknamed "The Monster Mile", was built in 1969 by Melvin Joseph of Melvin L. Joseph Construction Company, Inc., with an asphalt surface, but was replaced with concrete in 1995. Six years later in 2001, the track's capacity moved to 135,000 seats, making the track have the largest capacity of sports venue in the mid-Atlantic. In 2002, the name changed to Dover International Speedway from Dover Downs International Speedway after Dover Downs Gaming and Entertainment split, making Dover Motorsports. From 2007 to 2009, the speedway worked on an improvement project called "The Monster Makeover", which expanded facilities at the track and beautified the track. After the 2014 season, the track's capacity was reduced to 95,500 seats.

Entry list 

 (R) denotes rookie driver.

Qualifying 
Qualifying was split into two rounds. The first round was held on Friday, September 13, at 3:00 PM EST. Each driver would have one lap to set a time. During the first round, the top 20 drivers in the round would be guaranteed a starting spot in the race. If a driver was not able to guarantee a spot in the first round, they had the option to scrub their time from the first round and try and run a faster lap time in a second round qualifying run, held on Saturday, September 14, at 11:30 AM EST. As with the first round, each driver would have one lap to set a time. For this specific race, positions 21-40 would be decided on time, and depending on who needed it, a select amount of positions were given to cars who had not otherwise qualified on time but were high enough in owner's points; up to two were given. If needed, a past champion who did not qualify on either time or provisionals could use a champion's provisional, adding one more spot to the field.

No drivers would fail to qualify.

Full qualifying results

Race results

Standings after the results 

Drivers' Championship standings

Note: Only the first 10 positions are included for the driver standings.

References 

1991 NASCAR Winston Cup Series
NASCAR races at Dover Motor Speedway
September 1991 sports events in the United States
1991 in sports in Delaware